Atkinson House or Atkinson Hall are the name of buildings in the United States, and may refer to:

(by state then city)
Atkinson-Williams Warehouse, Fort Smith, Arkansas, listed on the National Register of Historic Places (NRHP) in Sebastian County
Atkinson House (Rutherford, California), listed on the NRHP in Napa County
Atkinson House (San Francisco, California), or Atkinson-Escher House, listed as a SFDL
Atkinson Hall, Georgia College, Milledgeville, Georgia, listed on the NRHP in Baldwin County
Atkinson Hall (Geneseo, Illinois), listed on the NRHP in Henry County
Samuel Josiah Atkinson House, Siloam, North Carolina, listed on the NRHP in Surry County
Atkinson-Smith House, Smithfield, North Carolina, listed on the NRHP in Johnston County
W. H. Atkinson House, Ashland, Oregon, listed on the NRHP listings in Jackson County
Atkinson House (Georgetown, Texas), listed on the NRHP in Williamson County
Atkinson-Morris House, Paris, Texas, listed on the NRHP in Lamar County
James and Hannah Atkinson House, Woods Cross, Utah, listed on the NRHP in Davis County